Let a Good Thing Go is the second single by Irish singer-songwriter Gemma Hayes, released in 2002 on the Source Records label.

Two versions of the single were released - incorporating slightly different covers.

Track listing

CD 1
All songs written by Gemma Hayes.
 "Let a Good Thing Go"
 "Hanging Around" (acoustic)
 "Pieces of Glass" (radio session)

Also includes video for "Let a Good Thing Go" (Directed by Sam Brown)

CD 2
 "Let a Good Thing Go"
 "Summers in Doubt"
 "Ran for Miles" (home demo)

7"
 "Let a Good Thing Go"
 "Pieces of Glass" (radio session)

Charts

2002 singles
Gemma Hayes songs
Songs written by Gemma Hayes
2002 songs
Song recordings produced by Dave Fridmann